The Margin (also known as The Streetwalker and Emmanuelle 77) is a 1976 French erotic drama film written and directed by  Walerian Borowczyk and starring Sylvia Kristel. It is loosely based on the novel The Margin by André Pieyre de Mandiargues.

It had admissions of 725,502 in France.

Cast
 Sylvia Kristel as Diana
 Joe Dallesandro as Sigismond
 André Falcon as Antonin Pons 
 Mireille Audibert as Sergine 
 Louise Chevalier as Féline
 Denis Manuel as Le Moustachu 
 Dominique Marcas

References

External links

1976 films
Films directed by Walerian Borowczyk
1970s erotic drama films
French erotic drama films
1976 drama films
1970s French-language films
1970s French films